The Two Paths can refer to:

 The Two Paths (1911 film), a 1911 American film
 Two Paths (1954 film), a 1954 Spanish film
 Two Paths (album), a 2017 Ensiferum album
 Two Paths: America Divided or United, a 2017 book by John Kasich